Sidi Bernoussi is a district and suburb of northeastern Casablanca, in the Casablanca-Settat region of Morocco. The district covers an area of 38.59 square kilometres (14.9 square miles) and as of 2010 had 503,522 inhabitants. It contains the football club Rachad Bernoussi, established in 1961.

Economy 

Sidi Bernoussi is one of the first districts that has opted for Aswaq Namoudajia ( a kind of modernized souk that gathers informal street merchants). One of them is near Almoukhtar Essoussi High School, and another one is near Alfirdaous Mosque.

Subdivisions
The district is divided into two arrondissements:

Sidi Bernoussi (arrondissement)
Hay El-Qods
Sidi Moumen

Notable people 
 Hicham Boutizla
 Redouane M'Kiddem
 Bouchaib El Moubarki
 Youssef Safri

References

Districts of Casablanca